The Nagaland Wrestling Association is a non-governmental sports organisation based in Kohima, Nagaland, India. Founded in 1971, it is the apex body responsible for organising the Naga Wrestling Championship, the biggest sport event in Nagaland and the Naga Open Wrestling Championship.

There are 3 affiliated members of the NWA—the Angami Wrestling Association, the Chakhesang Wrestling Association and the Zeliang Wrestling Association. The current president of the Nagaland Wrestling Association is Hiabe Zeliang.

See also
 Kene (Naga wrestling)

References

External links 

1971 establishments in Nagaland
 Sports organizations established in 1971
 Organisations based in Kohima